El Campillo de la Jara is a municipality located in the province of Toledo, Castile-La Mancha, Spain.  According to the 2014 census, the municipality has a population of 410 inhabitants.

See also
La Jara

References

External links

Populated places in the Province of Toledo